This is a list of notable alumni including currently matriculating students and alumni who are graduates or non-matriculating students of Morehouse College.

Morehouse College is a private, four-year, all-male, historically black college in Atlanta, Georgia. During enrollment at the college students are known as "Men of Morehouse." Upon graduation, alumni are ceremoniously initiated as lifetime "Morehouse Men." There are over 20,000 alumni of Morehouse College.

See also Morehouse College alumni.

Academia

Business

Entertainment, media, and literature

Government, law, and public policy

Religion

{{Alum|name=Raphael Warnock|year=1991|nota=Senior pastor of Ebenezer Baptist Church in Atlanta and United States Senator (D-GA)|ref=

Science and medicine

Service and social reform

Others

Notable faculty

References

Morehouse College alumni